Juan Pablo Llano (born 17 November 1977, Medellin, Colombia), is a Colombian actor and model.

Filmography

References

External links 

Colombian male telenovela actors
1977 births
Living people
21st-century Colombian male actors
People from Medellín